This is a list of law enforcement agencies in the state of North Carolina.

According to the US Bureau of Justice Statistics' 2008 Census of State and Local Law Enforcement Agencies, the state had 504 law enforcement agencies employing 23,442 sworn police officers, about 254 for each 100,000 residents. As of June 2022, this is the latest data available, as the report has not been conducted since 2008.

State agencies 

 Black Mountain Neuro-Medical Treatment Center Police - Black Mountain, North Carolina (NC Department of Health & Human Services)
 Broughton Hospital Police - Morganton, North Carolina (NC Department of Health & Human Services)
 Cherry Hospital Police – Goldsboro, North Carolina (NC Department of Health & Human Services)
 Longleaf Neuro-Medical Treatment Center Police - Wilson, North Carolina (NC Department of Health & Human Services)
 North Carolina Alcohol Law Enforcement Agency
 North Carolina Arboretum Campus Police - Asheville, North Carolina
 North Carolina Department of Agriculture State Fairgrounds Police - Raleigh, North Carolina
 North Carolina Department of Insurance Criminal Investigations Division
 North Carolina Division of Marine Fisheries Marine Patrol
 North Carolina Division of Motor Vehicles License and Theft Bureau
 North Carolina Division of Parks Law Enforcement Rangers
 North Carolina General Assembly Police
 North Carolina State Bureau of Investigation
 North Carolina State Capitol Police
 North Carolina State Highway Patrol
 North Carolina Division of Adult Corrections (Probation/Parole)
 North Carolina Museum of Art Special Police – Raleigh, North Carolina (Duties are now part of NC State Capitol Police)
 North Carolina State Ports Authority Police - Morehead City/Wilmington
 North Carolina Wildlife Resources Commission Law Enforcement
 North Carolina Forest Service, Criminal Investigations Unit
 North Carolina Department of Revenue, Criminal Investigations Unit, Unauthorized Substances, Motor Fuels Investigations
 North Carolina Secretary of State's Office, Securities, Trademarks, Notary
 North Carolina Department of Correction
 North Carolina Supreme Court Police
 O’Berry Neuro-Medical Treatment Center Police - Goldsboro, North Carolina (NC Department of Health & Human Services)

County agencies 
Sheriffs have been required in each county of North Carolina since the North Carolina Constitution of 1776.  Article VII, Section 2 of the 1971 Constitution of North Carolina gives the authority and qualifications for a sheriff in each county:
 "In each county a Sheriff shall be elected by the qualified voters thereof at the same time and places as members of the General Assembly are elected and shall hold his office for a period of four years, subject to removal for cause as provided by law. No person is eligible to serve as Sheriff if that person has been convicted of a felony against this State, the United States, or another state, whether or not that person has been restored to the rights of citizenship in the manner prescribed by law. Convicted of a felony includes the entry of a plea of guilty; a verdict or finding of guilt by a jury, judge, magistrate, or other adjudicating body, tribunal, or official, either civilian or military; or a plea of no contest, nolo contendere, or the equivalent. (2010-49, s. 1)"
In two counties, Gaston and Mecklenburg counties, the county police have constitutionally mandated county wide responsibilities instead of the sheriff's department.  
 

Alamance County Sheriff's Department - Graham
Alexander County Sheriff's Office - Taylorsville
Alleghany County Sheriff's Department - Sparta
Anson County Sheriff's Office - Wadesboro
Ashe County Sheriff's Office - Jefferson
Avery County Sheriff's Office - Newland
Beaufort County Sheriff's Office - Washington
Bertie County Sheriff's Office - Windsor
Bladen County Sheriff's Office - Elizabethtown
Brunswick County Sheriff's Office - Bolivia
Buncombe County Sheriff's Office - Asheville
Burke County Sheriff's Office - Morganton
Cabarrus County Sheriff's Office - Concord
Caldwell County Sheriff's Office - Lenoir
Camden County Sheriff's Office - Camden
Carteret County Sheriff's Department - Beaufort
Caswell County Sheriff's Office - Yanceyville
Catawba County Sheriff's Office - Newton
Chatham County Sheriff's Office - Pittsboro
Cherokee County Sheriff's Office - Murphy
Chowan County Sheriff's Office - Edenton
Clay County Sheriff's Office - Hayesville
Cleveland County Sheriff's Office - Shelby
Columbus County Sheriff's Office - Whiteville
Craven County Sheriff's Office - New Bern
Cumberland County Sheriff's Office - Fayetteville
Currituck County Sheriff's Office - Currituck
Dare County Sheriff's Office - Manteo
Davidson County Sheriff's Office - Lexington
Davie County Sheriff's Office - Mocksville
Duplin County Sheriff's Office - Kenansville
Durham County Sheriff's Office - Durham
Edgecombe County Sheriff's Office - Tarboro
Forsyth County Sheriff's Office - Winston-Salem
Franklin County Sheriff's Office - Louisburg
Gaston County Police Department - Gastonia
Gaston County Sheriff's Office - Gastonia
Gates County Sheriff's Department - Gatesville
Graham County Sheriff's Department - Robbinsville
Granville County Sheriff's Office - Oxford
Greene County Sheriff's Office - Snow Hill
Guilford County Sheriff's Office - Greensboro
Halifax County Sheriff's Office - Halifax
Harnett County Sheriff's Office - Lillington
Haywood County Sheriff's Office - Waynesville
Henderson County Sheriff's Department - Hendersonville
Hertford County Sheriff's Office - Winton
Hoke County Sheriff's Office - Raeford
Hyde County Sheriff's Office - Swan Quarter
Iredell County Sheriff's Office - Statesville
Jackson County Sheriff's Office - Sylva
Johnston County Sheriff's Office - Smithfield
Jones County Sheriff's Office - Trenton
Lee County Sheriff's Office - Sanford
Lenoir County Sheriff's Office - Kinston
Lincoln County Sheriff's Office - Lincolnton
Macon County Sheriff's Office - Franklin
Madison County Sheriff's Department - Marshall
Martin County Sheriff's Office - Williamston
McDowell County Sheriff's Department - Marion
Mecklenburg County Sheriff's Office - Charlotte
Mitchell County Sheriff's Office - Bakersville
Montgomery County Sheriff's Office - Troy
Moore County Sheriff's Department - Carthage
Nash County Sheriff's Office - Nashville
New Hanover County Sheriff's Office - Castle Hayne
Northampton County Sheriff's Office - Jackson
Onslow County Sheriff's Office - Jacksonville
Orange County Sheriff's Office - Hillsborough
Pamlico County Sheriff's Department - Bayboro
Pasquotank County Sheriff's Office - Elizabeth City
Pender County Sheriff's Office - Burgaw
Perquimans County Sheriff's Department - Hertford
Person County Sheriff's Department - Roxboro
Pitt County Sheriff's Office - Greenville
Polk County Sheriff's Office - Columbus
Randolph County Sheriff's Office - Asheboro
Richmond County Sheriff's Office - Rockingham
Robeson County Sheriff's Department - Lumberton
Rockingham County Sheriff's Office - Wentworth
Rowan County Sheriff's Office - Salisbury
Rutherford County Sheriff's Department - Rutherfordton
Sampson County Sheriff's Office - Clinton
Scotland County Sheriff's Office - Laurinburg
Stanly County Sheriff's Office - Albemarle
Stokes County Sheriff's Department - Danbury
Surry County Sheriff's Office - Dobson
Swain County Sheriff's Office - Bryson City
Transylvania County Sheriff's Office - Brevard
Tyrrell County Sheriff's Office - Columbia
Union County Sheriff's Office - Monroe
Vance County Sheriff's Department - Henderson
Wake County Sheriff's Office - Raleigh
Warren County Sheriff's Office - Warrenton
Washington County Sheriff's Office - Plymouth
Watauga County Sheriff's Office - Boone
Wayne County Sheriff's Office - Goldsboro
Wilkes County Sheriff's Office - Wilkesboro
Wilson County Sheriff's Office - Wilson
Yadkin County Sheriff's Office - Yadkinville
Yancey County Sheriff's Office - Burnsville

City/town agencies 

Aberdeen Police Department
Ahoskie Police Department
Albemarle Police Department
Andrews Police Department
Angier Police Department
Apex Police Department
Archdale Police Department
Asheboro Police Department
Asheville Police Department
Atlantic Beach Police Department
Aulander Police Department
Aurora Police Department
Ayden Police Department
Badin Police Department
Bailey Police Department
Bald Head Island Public Safety
Bakersville Police Department
Banner Elk Police Department
Beaufort Police Department
Beech Mountain Police Department
Belhaven Police Department
Belmont Police Department
Benson Police Department
Bessemer City Police Department
Bethel Police Department
Beulaville Police Department
Biltmore Forest Police Department
Biscoe Police Department
Black Creek Police Department
Black Mountain Police Department
Bladenboro Police Department
Blowing Rock Police Department
Boiling Spring Lakes Police Department 
Boiling Springs Police Department
Bolton Police Department
Boone Police Department
Boonville Police Department
Brevard Police Department
Bridgeton Police Department
Broadway Police Department
Brookford Police Department
Bryson City Police Department
Bunn Police Department
Burgaw Police Department
Burlington Police Department
Burnsville Police Department
Butner Public Safety
Candor Police Department
Canton Police Department
Cape Carteret Police Department
Carolina Beach Police Department
Carrboro Police Department
Carthage Police Department
Cary Police Department
Caswell Beach Police Department
Catawba Police Department
Chadbourn Police Department
Chapel Hill Police Department
Charlotte-Mecklenburg Police Department
Cherryville Police Department
China Grove Police Department
Chocowinity Police Department
Claremont Police Department
Clarkton Police Department
Clayton Police Department
Cleveland Police Department
Clinton Police Department
Clyde Police Department
Coats Police Department
Columbus Police Department
Concord Police Department
Conover Police Department
Conway Police Department
Cooleemee Police Department
Cornelius Police Department
Cramerton Police Department
Creedmoor Police Department
Dallas Police Department
Davidson Police Department
Denton Police Department
Dobson Police Department
Drexel Police Department
Duck Police Department
Dunn Police Department
Durham Police Department
East Bend Police Department
East Spencer Police Department
Eden Police Department
Edenton Police Department
Elizabeth City Police Department
Elizabethtown Police Department
Elkin Police Department
Ellerbe Police Department
Elon Police Department
Emerald Isle Police Department
Enfield Police Department
Erwin Police Department
Fair Bluff Police Department
Fairmont Police Department
Farmville Police Department
Fayetteville Police Department
Fletcher Police Department
Forest City Police Department
Four Oaks Police Department
Foxfire Village Police Department
Franklin Police Department
Franklinton Police Department
Fremont Police Department
Fuquay-Varina Police Department
Garner Police Department
Garysburg Police Department
Gastonia Police Department
Gibsonville Police Department
Glen Alpine Police Department
Goldsboro Police Department
Graham Police Department
Granite Falls Police Department
Granite Quarry Police Department
Greenevers Police Department
Greensboro Police Department
Greenville Police Department
Grifton Police Department
Grover Police Department
Hamlet Police Department
Havelock Police Department
Haw River Police Department
Henderson Police Department
Hendersonville Police Department
Hertford Police Department
Hickory Police Department
High Point Police Department 
Highlands Police Department
Hillsborough Police Department
Holden Beach Police Department
Holly Ridge Police Department
Holly Springs Police Department
Hope Mills Police Department
Hot Springs Police Department
Hudson Police Department
Huntersville Police Department
Indian Beach Police Department
Jackson Police Department
Jacksonville Police Department
Jefferson Police Department
Jonesville Police Department
Kannapolis Police Department
Kenansville Police Department
Kenly Police Department
Kernersville Police Department
Kill Devil Hills Police Department
King Police Department
Kings Mountain Police Department
Kinston Police Department
Kitty Hawk Police Department
Knightdale Police Department
Kure Beach Police Department
LaGrange Police Department
Lake Lure Police Department
Lake Waccamaw Police Department
Landis Police Department
Laurel Park Police Department
Laurinburg Police Department
Leland Police Department
Lenoir Police Department
Lewiston Woodville Police Department
Lexington Police Department
Liberty Police Department
Lilesville Police Department
Lillington Police Department
Lincolnton Police Department
Littleton Police Department
Locust Police Department
Long View Police Department
Louisburg Police Department
Lowell Police Department
Lucama Police Department
Lumberton Police Department
Madison Police Department
Maggie Valley Police Department
Magnolia Police Department
Maiden Police Department
Manteo Police Department
Marion Police Department
Marshall Police Department
Mars Hill Police Department
Marshville Police Department
Matthews Police Department
Maxton Police Department
Mayodan Police Department
Maysville Police Department
Mebane Police Department
Micro Police Department
Middlesex Police Department
Mint Hill Police Department
Misenheimer Police Department
Monroe Police Department
Montreat Police Department
Mooresville Police Department
Morehead City Police Department
Morganton Public Safety
Morrisville Police Department
Mount Airy Police Department
Mount Gilead Police Department
Mount Holly Police Department
Mount Olive Police Department
Murfreesboro Police Department
Murphy Police Department
Nags Head Police Department
Nashville Police Department
Navassa Police Department
New Bern Police Department
Newland Police Department
Newport Police Department
Newton Police Department
Newton Grove Police Department
Norlina Police Department
North Topsail Beach Police Department
North Wilkesboro Police Department
Northwest Police Department
Norwood Police Department
Oakboro Police Department
Oak Island Police Department
Ocean Isle Beach Police Department
Old Fort Police Department
Oriental Police Department
Oxford Police Department
Parkton Police Department
Pembroke Police Department
Pikeville Police Department
Pilot Mountain Police Department
Pine Knoll Shores Police Department
Pine Level Police Department
Pinebluff Police Department
Pinehurst Police Department
Pinetops Police Department
Pineville Police Department
Pink Hill Police Department
Pittsboro Police Department
Plymouth Police Department
Polkton Police Department
Princeton Police Department
Raeford Police Department
Raleigh Police Department
Ramseur Police Department
Randleman Police Department
Ranlo Police Department
Red Springs Police Department 
Reidsville Police Department
Rhodhiss Police Department
Richlands Police Department
River Bend Police Department
Rich Square Police Department
Roanoke Rapids Police Department
Robbins Police Department
Robersonville Police Department
RockinghamPolice Department
Rockwell Police Department
Rocky Mount Police Department
Rolesville Police Department
Rose Hill Police Department
Roseboro Police Department
Rowland Police Department
Roxboro Police Department
Rutherfordton Police Department
Saint Pauls Police Department
Salisbury Police Department
Saluda Police Department
Sanford Police Department
Scotland Neck Police Department
Seaboard Police Department
Seagrove Police Department
Selma Police Department
Seven Devils Public Safety Department
Shallotte Police Department
Sharpsburg Police Department
Shelby Police Department
Siler City Police Department
Simpson Police Department
Smithfield Police Department
Snow Hill Police Department
Southern Pines Police Department
Southern Shores Police Department
Southport Police Department
Sparta Police Department
Spencer Police Department
Spindale Police Department
Spring Hope Police Department
Spring Lake Police Department
Spruce Pine Police Department
Stallings Police Department
Stanfield Police Department
Stanley Police Department
Stantonsburg Police Department
Star Police Department
Statesville Police Department
Stedman Police Department
Stem Police Department
Stoneville Police Department
Sugar Mountain Police Department
Sunset Beach Police Department
Surf City Police Department
Swansboro Police Department
Sylva Police Department
Tabor City Police Department
Tarboro Police Department
Taylorsville Police Department
Taylortown Police Department
Thomasville Police Department
Topsail Beach Police Department
Trent Woods Police Department
Troutman Police Department
Troy Police Department
Tryon Police Department
Valdese Police Department
Vanceboro Police Department
Vass Police Department
Wadesboro Police Department
Wagram Police Department
Wake Forest Police Department
Wallace Police Department
Walnut Creek Police Department
Warrenton Police Department
Warsaw Police Department
Washington Police Department
Waxhaw Police Department
Waynesville Police Department
Weaverville Police Department
Weldon Police Department
Wendell Police Department
West Jefferson Police Department
Whispering Pines Police Department
Whitakers Police Department
White Lake Police Department
Whiteville Police Department
Wilkesboro Police Department
Williamston Police Department
Wilmington Police Department
Wilson Police Department
Wilson's Mills Police Department
Windsor Police Department
Wingate Police Department
Winston-Salem Police Department
Winterville Police Department
Winton Police Department
Woodfin Police Department
Woodland Police Department
Wrightsville Beach Police Department
Yadkinville Police Department
Yanceyville Police Department
Youngsville Police Department
Zebulon Police Department

College & university agencies 

Appalachian State University Police – Boone
Asheville-Buncombe Technical Community College Police - Asheville
Barton College - Wilson - police services by Wilson PD (Barton College District)
Belmont Abbey College Campus Safety and Police – Belmont
Beaufort County Community College Police - Washington
Blue Ridge Community College Police Department - Flat Rock
Brunswick Community College Police - Bolivia, Leland, Carolina Shores, Southport
Campbell University Department of Campus Safety – Buies Creek - police services by contracted Harnett County SO
Cape Fear Community College Police - Wilmington
Carolina University  Campus Safety - Winston-Salem
Catawba College Office of Public Safety – Salisbury
Chowan University Campus Safety – Murfreesboro 
Davidson College Department of Public Safety and Police  - Davidson
Duke University Police – Durham
Durham Tech. Comm. College Campus Police - Durham
East Carolina University Police – Greenville
Elizabeth City State University's Campus Police – Elizabeth City 
Elon University Campus Police – Elon
Fayetteville State University Police – Fayetteville 
Forsyth Technical Community College Campus Police – Winston-Salem
Gardner-Webb University Campus Police – Boiling Springs
Gaston College Campus Police - Dallas
Greensboro College Campus Security – Greensboro
Guilford College Security – Greensboro
Guilford Technical Community College Campus Police - Jamestown
High Point University Campus Police – High Point
Johnson C. Smith University Campus Police – Charlotte
Lees-McRae College Campus Safety – Banner Elk
Lenoir-Rhyne College Campus Security – Hickory
Livingstone College Campus Police & Public Safety - Salisbury
Louisburg College Campus Safety & Police - Louisburg
Mars Hill College Campus Security – Mars Hill
Meredith College Campus Police – Raleigh
Methodist University Public Safety – Fayetteville
Montreat College Campus Police - Montreat
Nash Community College Campus Police - Rocky Mount 
North Carolina A&T State University Department of Police & Public Safety – Greensboro 
North Carolina Central University Police – Durham
North Carolina State University Police - Raleigh
North Carolina Wesleyan College Police - Greensboro
Pfeiffer University – (Village of Misenheimer Police) - Misenheimer, Charlotte, Morrisville
Pitt Community College Campus Police - Greenville
Queens University of Charlotte Police - Charlotte
Saint Andrews Presbyterian College Campus Safety and Security – Laurinburg
St. Augustine’s University Campus Police Department - Raleigh
Salem College Department of Public Safety – Winston-Salem
Sandhills Community College Police & Public Safety - Pinehurst
Shaw University Campus Police - Raleigh
Southeastern Community College Campus Police - Whiteville
Surry Community College Campus Police - Dobson
University of Mount Olive Campus Safety - Mount Olive
University of North Carolina at Asheville Campus Police – Asheville
University of North Carolina at Chapel Hill Department of Public Safety – Chapel Hill
University of North Carolina at Charlotte Police – Charlotte
University of North Carolina at Greensboro Department of Public Safety & Police – Greensboro
University of North Carolina at Pembroke Police and Public Safety Department – Pembroke
University of North Carolina School of the Arts Police – Winston-Salem
University of North Carolina at Wilmington University Police – Wilmington
Vance-Granville Community College Police - Henderson 
Wayne Community College Campus Police – Goldsboro
Wake Forest University Police - Winston-Salem
Wake Technical Community College Police - Raleigh
Western Carolina University Police - Cullowhee
Wilkes Community College Police - Wilkesboro
Wilson Community College Police - Wilson
Wingate University Campus Safety - Wingate
Winston-Salem State University Police - Winston-Salem

Other agencies

Albert J. Ellis Airport Police – Richlands
Allied Universal Special Police - Charlotte  
Appalachian Regional Healthcare System Police – Boone
Ashe Memorial Hospital Police - Jefferson
Asheville Regional Airport (AVL) Department of Public Safety - Asheville
Atrium Health Police - various areas in NC & GA
Avery County Public Schools Campus Law Enforcement – Newland
Biltmore Estates Company Police - Asheville
Blue Line Special Police - Graham
Blue Ridge Public Safety - Cashiers/Sapphire Valley area
Caliber Special Police - Durham
Capitol Special Police - Raleigh, Wake County, Durham, Durham County, Orange County areas
CarolinaEast Health System Police - New Bern
Catawba Valley Medical Center Special Police - Catawba
Charlotte Douglas International Airport (CLT) Police - Charlotte
Charlotte-Mecklenburg Schools Police - Charlotte
Cherokee County Schools Special Police - Cherokee
Cherokee Tribal Police Department
Delta Company Police - Morganton
Down East Protection Systems Company Police - Kinston
Duke Power Company Police - Huntersville
ECU Health Police - Greenville, ECU Health Roanoke-Chowan Hospital, Ahoskie; ECU Health Beaufort Hospital, Washington; ECU Health Chowan Hospital, Edenton; ECU Health Bertie Hospital, Windsor; ECU Health Duplin Hospital, Kenansville; ECU Health Edgecombe Hospital, Tarboro; The Outer Banks Hospital, Nags Head (jointly owned with Chesapeake Regional Healthcare); ECU Health North Hospital, Roanoke Rapids
Elite Police-Special Police - Charlotte
Enforcement Company Police - Charlotte
Fort Fisher Company Police - Kure Beach
FTC Company Police - Charlotte
G4S Secure Solutions Special Police - Charlotte
Global One Company Police and Public Safety - Youngsville
Graham County Schools Company Police - Robbinsville
Harnett Health Care System Company Police - Dunn
King Special Police - Monroe
Kodiak Company Police - Charlotte
Lake Royale Company Police - Louisburg 
Lankford Company Police Department, based in Greensboro - sites statewide
Lenoir Memorial Hospital Company Police - Kinston
Linville Land Harbor Special Police - Linville
Moore County Schools Police - Carthage
Mountain Security Patrol Special Police - Franklin
N.C. Special Police (A Services Group/ASG) - Fayetteville
Never Quit Services Company Police - Angier
New Hanover Regional Medical Center Police - Wilmington
NightHawk Company Police - Raleigh
North State Security Group Company Police - Winston-Salem
NOVA Agency Company Police - Raleigh
ODS Company Police - Burlington
On Point Company Police - Raleigh
OS-NQS Company Police - Angier
Pacific Unified Company Police - Charlotte
Piedmont Triad International Airport (PTI) Police - Greensboro
Pinnacle Special Police - Wilmington
Precision Special Police - Charlotte
Professional Police Services Inc. - Stanley
Pyramids Village Special Police - Greensboro
Raleigh-Durham International Airport (RDU) Police - Wake County
Richmond County Schools Company Police - Hamlet
SAS Institute Company Police - Cary
Sheepdog Company Police - Hickory 
Southeastern Public Safety - Charlotte
S.P.E.A.R Special Police - Winston-Salem
State Special Police - McLeansville
Statewide Company Police - Troy
UNC Hospitals Police - Chapel Hill - sites statewide
United Special Police - Morganton
Office of the United States Marshal for the Eastern District of North Carolina
Office of the United States Marshal for the Middle District of North Carolina
Office of the United States Marshal for the Western District of North Carolina
Vidant Medical Center Police 
Wackenhut Company Police - Greensboro, Pitt County
WakeMed Campus Police and Public Safety - Raleigh
Williams Company Police - Greensboro
Wilmington International Airport (ILM) Police - Wilmington
Yancey County Schools Campus Police - Burnsville

Disbanded/Defunct agencies
Mocksville Police Department (Disbanded in 2021)

See also
 NC SBI non-governmental agency list

References

 
North Carolina
Law enforcement agencies